Morning Glory is a 2010 American romantic comedy-drama film directed by Roger Michell and written by Aline Brosh McKenna. Starring Rachel McAdams, Harrison Ford, Diane Keaton, Patrick Wilson and Jeff Goldblum, the film tells the story of an upstart television producer who accepts the challenge of reviving a morning show program with warring co-hosts.

Morning Glory was released in theaters on November 10, 2010, by Paramount Pictures. It received mixed reviews from critics and grossed $60 million against a $40 million budget.

Plot
Aspiring news producer Becky Fuller has dreamed since childhood of working for the Today show, but her dedication to her career puts off potential suitors. Laid off from her job at Good Morning New Jersey, her mother advises her to give up her dream before it becomes an embarrassment. Becky perseveres, and receives a call from IBS News, which is seeking a producer for its struggling national morning show, DayBreak.

After a discouraging job interview with executive Jerry Barnes, who dismisses both her and DayBreak as also-rans, Becky is brushed off in the elevator by one of her heroes, veteran television journalist Mike Pomeroy. Seemingly against his better judgement, Jerry hires Becky as DayBreak executive producer, and she moves to New York City.

On her first day, Becky realizes she has signed on to a show in turmoil, lacking in direction and money. After meeting acerbic, long-suffering co-host Colleen Peck, Becky fires the lecherous co-host Paul McVee, to her co-workers' delight. She chooses an unwilling Mike as Colleen's new co-host; under contract to IBS, he has escaped being utilized while still getting paid. Becky finds a clause in his contract requiring him to accept an official job offer or lose his salary, forcing him to comply.

Becky meets Adam Bennett, a fellow IBS producer who worked with the difficult Mike. They begin dating, and he is initially supportive of her dedication to her job. Contemptuous of morning television, Mike tries to sabotage his DayBreak debut by getting drunk. He refuses to banter, rejects segments he feels are beneath him, and antagonizes Colleen.

Jerry informs Becky that IBS wants to cancel DayBreak, blaming her for the ratings' further slump. After a heated confrontation with Mike, Becky snaps and decides on a radical approach to save the show. Persuading Jerry to give her the show's remaining six weeks to vastly improve ratings, Becky sends Ernie, DayBreak weatherman, on stunts such as riding roller coasters and skydiving. 

Colleen joins Becky's campaign to rejuvenate the show, appearing in colorful segments that help the show's ratings, but Jerry remains unconvinced. Adam, not realizing what is on the line, teases Becky about how caught up she is in improving the ratings; seeing this as a criticism she has heard from other men, Becky walks out.

With the six-week deadline approaching, Mike shows interest in doing a story on a sauerkraut festival, surprising his colleagues. Becky accompanies him, but realizes he is going to the Governor's summer house instead, and informs him that the show will be cancelled. Undeterred, Mike confronts the Governor on charges of racketeering, breaking the story of his arrest on live television. Mike tells Becky that he was similarly over-committed to his job, at the expense of his family and personal life.

The live arrest increases DayBreak ratings enough to secure another year for the show, and Becky receives a job offer from the Today show. She reconnects with Adam, and lashes out at Mike for his stubbornness. Becky accepts the job interview, with DayBreak on in the background. When Colleen tells Mike that his refusal to adapt has driven Becky away, he walks off air and storms the kitchen. Becky watches in shock as Mike presents a cooking segment, expertly showing viewers how to make a frittata. Becky runs back to the studio, deciding to remain at DayBreak.

Cast
 Rachel McAdams as Becky Fuller, the new executive producer of DayBreak, the fourteenth in eleven years, challenged with improving the show's ratings
 Harrison Ford as Mike Pomeroy, a serious news journalist and anchor who has worked in television for over forty years. He is unhappy at having to co-host a show that does not deal with real news stories.
 Diane Keaton as Colleen Peck, the host of DayBreak for the past eleven years, in which time she has gone through several co-hosts and executive producers
 Patrick Wilson as Adam Bennett, another producer at IBS, who begins dating Becky
 John Pankow as Lenny Bergman, the long-term senior producer of the show
 Jeff Goldblum as Jerry Barnes, a network executive, he tasks Becky with turning the show's ratings around
 Matt Malloy as Ernie Appleby, the DayBreak weatherperson
 Ty Burrell as Paul McVee, the co-host of the show at the beginning of the film. Becky immediately fires him because of his negative effect on staff morale.
 Patti D'Arbanville as Mrs. Fuller, Becky's mother
 Adrian Martinez as IBS lobby guard
 Curtis "50 Cent" Jackson, Lloyd Banks, and Tony Yayo as themselves
 Chris Matthews, Morley Safer, Bob Schieffer, Jonathan Bennett, and Elaine Kaufman make cameo appearances.

Production

The premise of the film was partially inspired by Neil Simon's The Sunshine Boys, where Harrison Ford's role was akin to Clark while Diane Keaton's role was akin to Lewis and Rachel McAdams' role was akin to Clark's nephew Ben. Screenwriter Aline Brosh McKenna and producer J. J. Abrams "dreamed of having Harrison Ford in the film" from the point of early script development. Shortly after Abrams cast Harrison Ford as Mike Pomeroy, Roger Michell took over as director.

Despite their long careers in Hollywood, Keaton and Ford had never met prior to Morning Glory. Harrison Ford explained: "We have been working in the same business, different branches of the business. She was in the intellectual branch and I was in the running, jumping and falling down branch. So, we never had the chance to work together. But it was a real pleasure to finally get that opportunity." Morning Glory marked Keaton's and McAdams' second film together. They previously co-starred in the 2005 comedy drama The Family Stone. Billed as a starring vehicle for McAdams, she initially felt she was unsuited to the role because "I'm not funny. So I said, 'if you need me to be funny, you might want to look somewhere else'". Roger Michell, the film's director, had a number of dinners with McAdams and persuaded her to join the cast.

Music

The film's theme song is "Strip Me" by Natasha Bedingfield. A song called "Same Changes" by The Weepies was recorded exclusively for the film. David Arnold also composed the film score. No official soundtrack was released, though the following songs were used in the film:

Reception

Box office
The film was originally scheduled for release on July 30, 2010, in the U.S. It was then pushed back to November 12, 2010. Finally, Paramount Pictures shifted the release date to November 10, 2010. In its opening five days, Morning Glory earned about $12 million at US box offices, which was considered a poor result for a film with major stars like Keaton and Ford. On its release date, it debuted at number 3 behind Due Date and Megamind, though the next day it dropped to fourth place when For Colored Girls beat it to third. It kept on switching from fifth to fourth place several times until November 19, when it dropped to sixth. For the week of November 19–24, it stayed at number 6 until finally sliding to tenth place. It stayed in theaters until January 20, 2011. Ultimately, the film earned more than $31 million in the United States, and over $27 million internationally for a worldwide total of almost $59 million.

The press emphasized that it was another box office disappointment for Ford. With the exception of Indiana Jones and the Kingdom of the Crystal Skull, Harrison Ford had not had a hit for a decade. Steven Zeitchik wrote in the Los Angeles Times: "What's most disappointing about "Morning Glory" is that, after a decade without a comedy, Ford's turn in something more spry was supposed to mark a new chapter by getting him back to his crowd-pleasing ways. But the movie's disappointing performance adds one more nail in a coffin that's been enveloping Ford's career, 'Buried'-style, for years." Jeff Bock, a box-office analyst with Exhibitor Relations, told TheWrap: "When Ford wears that iconic hat, he can still crack the box office bullwhip, but outside of Indy it's become a tougher case."

McAdams was disappointed that the film failed to find a larger audience, remarking that "I only hear these businesspeople: 'Well, no one was sure who it was for.'"

Critical response

On Rotten Tomatoes, the film holds an approval rating of 55% based on 178 reviews, with an average rating of 5.98/10. The website's critical consensus reads, "It's lifted by affable performances from its impeccable cast, and it's often charming – but Morning Glory is also inconsistent and derivative." On Metacritic, the film has a weighted average score of 57 out of 100, based on 38 critics, indicating "mixed or average reviews". Audiences polled by CinemaScore gave the film an average grade of "B" on an A+ to F scale.

One of the main criticisms about Morning Glory was that the film did not provide any substance about television and the media unlike Network (1976) or Broadcast News (1987). Peter Howell of the Toronto Star wrote: "You'll think of Broadcast News and Network watching it, and possibly lament how the film ducks the tough issues of media accountability and culpability that those films dealt with decades ago. (...) Are they [director Roger Michell and screenwriter Aline Brosh McKenna] trying to say anything meaningful about television and the media? If so, they've failed." Stephen Whitty of The Star-Ledger noted that Broadcast News, as opposed to Morning Glory, "was also about something – the conflict between faked telegenic "moments" and hard-news reality (...) And that's what made it not just a fun film but a classic." He concluded: "It's a good enough movie. But it came this close to being great."

The critics who enjoyed Morning Glory pointed out that the film was funny and entertaining. James Berardinelli of ReelViews wrote: "Despite the conventional manner in which the story is resolved, Morning Glory generates enough entertainment, good will, and genuine laughs to make it hard to dislike [...] It fits into a shrinking category: the old-fashioned, not-too-raunchy, character-based comedy. It's gentle, unforced and, despite its flaws, likeable. It doesn't blaze new trails or astound with its wit but, more likely than not, you'll leave the theater with a smile, and that's certainly worth a recommendation." Lou Lumenick of the New York Post said: "This unofficial update on the news-vs.-fluff wars does get in some good shots at the wacky world of morning television.... It includes more than a few clever lines, and boasts a stellar cast." Andrew O'Hehir of Salon described the film as "a brash, lightweight backstage comedy that looks lovely, doesn't insult its audience and uses its stars, both young and old, to terrific effect." Ty Burr of The Boston Globe wrote: "The movie's a pleasant and occasionally hilarious ride, even if there's a bait-and-switch at its core." Roger Ebert of the Chicago Sun-Times awarded Morning Glory three-and-a-half stars out of four. He stated: "Morning Glory is funny entertainment to begin with, and then Rachel McAdams transforms it. And Harrison Ford transforms himself. (...) This is the kind I like best. It grows from human nature and is about how people do their jobs and live their lives."

Most critics stressed that one of the assets of the film was the performances of its all-star cast. Harrison Ford got strong reviews for his performance in the film. Ebert of the Chicago Sun-Times said: "Ford doesn't venture beyond his usual acting range, but within it he creates a character with a reluctantly human inside." Peter Travers of Rolling Stone called the film "a tart, terrific comedy that gives Harrison Ford his best and funniest role in years." He added: "The iconic Han Solo and Indiana Jones shows real comic chops as Mike Pomeroy." According to Owen Gleiberman of Entertainment Weekly, "Ford is still a magnetic hunk of gray-granite movie star, and in Morning Glory, he finds a way to trick up his deadly somber, shifting-quicksand delivery into a shrewd and amusing acting style." Joe Neumaier of the New York Daily News wrote that "Ford is the most casual he's been since Working Girl," while Colin Covert of the Minneapolis Star Tribune stated: "Ford's gravitas and comedic irritability are in perfect balance here." Rex Reed of The New York Observer noted: "All of which gives Harrison Ford a role that fits him like a condom. He gets to be gruff, granite-faced, mean-spirited, rude and pessimistic, never cracking a smile and scowling like a rat just died in the studio's air-conditioning pipes.... The cast is perfect (scowling irascibly like Clifton Webb, Mr. Ford has never been this good)."

Several critics also liked McAdams' performance. Manohla Dargis wrote in The New York Times: "Ms. McAdams plays her role exceptionally well: as the young actress on the verge of the big time, who can win the boy, tame the beast, flash her panties and make you smile without making you cringe, she is a natural."
Kenneth Turan of the Los Angeles Times stated: "Though the film's advertising gives the impression that McAdams is one among equals, the reality is that this is her show. (...) she's never carried an entire film as completely and as easily as she does here." Roger Ebert of the Chicago Sun-Times compared Rachel McAdams' performance to Amy Adams' Academy Award nominated role in Junebug. Keaton's performance was praised as well. According to ReelViews, "Keaton is so good at her part that one can see her sliding effortlessly into an anchor's chair on a real morning show." Critics said that there was good chemistry between Diane Keaton and Harrison Ford. Peter Travers of Rolling Stone stated: "Ford and Keaton are delicious together." For Rex Reed, "Some of the on-camera bitchery between Mr. Ford and Ms. Keaton is laugh-out-loud witty." But it was also noted that Keaton was underused in the film.

In a 2023 interview with James Hibberd of The Hollywood Reporter, Ford reflected on how Morning Glory performed after being asked by Hibberd if he learned something about some of the not-well received films he made during the late 1990s and early 2000s, musing that even if the film "got its money back", he feels like Michell's direction and the performances of McAdams and Keaton could have been enough to make the movie work, as he believes that the film should have worked with all that talent.

Accolades

References

External links
 
 
 
 
 
 

2010 films
2010 romantic comedy-drama films
2010s English-language films
American romantic comedy-drama films
Bad Robot Productions films
Films about journalists
Films about television people
Films directed by Roger Michell
Films produced by J. J. Abrams
Films scored by David Arnold
Films set in New York City
Films shot in New Jersey
Films shot in New York City
Films with screenplays by Aline Brosh McKenna
Paramount Pictures films
2010s American films